Leonard Warren Webber  (born November 10, 1960) is a Canadian politician who has served as the Member of Parliament for the riding of Calgary Confederation since 2015 as a member of the Conservative Party of Canada. During the 43rd Canadian Parliament his private member bill An Act to amend the Canada Revenue Agency Act (organ and tissue donors) (Bill C-210) was adopted to allow Canadians to indicate their intent to sign up as a donor through their annual income tax return. Previously, he was a Conservative Member of the Legislative Assembly of Alberta, representing the constituency of Calgary-Foothills from 2004 to 2014, serving cabinet portfolios of Minister of International & Intergovernmental Affairs and Minister of Aboriginal Relations.

Early life

Webber was born November 10, 1960 in Calgary, Alberta. His father, Dr. Neil Webber, served as the Member of the Legislative Assembly for the constituency of Calgary-Bow from 1975 until 1989 and was also a member of cabinet. (Len) Webber graduated from the University of Calgary with a Bachelor of Commerce degree and went on to acquire his Journeyman Communications Electrician certificate from the Southern Alberta Institute of Technology (SAIT). He then pursued work as an apprentice electrician and managed his own contracting company for 10 years. Prior to seeking office, Webber served as vice president and director of the Webber Academy, a private University preparatory school in southwest Calgary.

Political career

Webber first sought public office in the 2004 provincial election in the constituency of Calgary-Foothills. In that election, he received 57% of the vote. In addition to his responsibilities as MLA during his first term, Webber held the position of Deputy Government Whip and was chair of the Advisory Committee on Climate Change, the MLA Review Committee of Private Investigators and Security Guards Act, the Healthy Aging and Continuing Care in Alberta Committee, and the MLA Task Force on Affordable Housing and Homelessness in Alberta. He also acted as co-chair of the MLA Task Force on Continuing Care Health Service and Accommodation Standards Committee and served as a member of numerous other committees and boards.

In the 2008 provincial election, Webber was reelected as MLA for Calgary-Foothills with 48% of the vote. He serves as a member of the Board of Directors for the Calgary Stampede, the Calgary Homeless Foundation, and WorldSkills Calgary 2009. Webber was re-elected in 2012, and in March 2014 left the Progressive Conservative caucus to sit as an independent in protest against the leadership of Alison Redford.

Webber resigned his seat in the legislature on September 29, 2014, one day after winning the federal Conservative Party of Canada nomination for the newly created urban riding of Calgary Confederation. He was elected in the 2015 federal election, to be the Member of Parliament for Calgary Confederation, though his party formed the official opposition. During the 42nd Canadian Parliament he introduced one private member bill which passed the House of Commons but died in the senate. He was re-elected in the 2019 federal election. During the 43rd Canadian Parliament Webber re-introduced his private member bill An Act to amend the Canada Revenue Agency Act (organ and tissue donors) (Bill C-210), adopted in June 2021 with all party support, to allow Canadians to indicate their intent to sign up as a donor through their annual income tax return.

Before being elected to the House of Commons, Webber served three terms as a Member of the Legislative Assembly of Alberta for the constituency of Calgary-Foothills and served in the cabinet portfolios of Minister of International & Intergovernmental Affairs and Minister of Aboriginal Relations.

Personal life

Webber has three daughters. His wife is deceased. Webber has been involved with Hospice Calgary, the MS Society, the Calgary Foundation, and the Alberta Alcohol and Drug Abuse Commission (AADAC). He is an advocate for events surrounding breast cancer awareness and research. Webber is a recipient of the Alberta Centennial Medal and the Queen Elizabeth II Diamond Jubilee Medal for his many philanthropic contributions.

Electoral record

Federal

Provincial

References

External links

 
 Legislative Assembly of Alberta

1960 births
Conservative Party of Canada MPs
Independent Alberta MLAs
Living people
Members of the Executive Council of Alberta
Members of the House of Commons of Canada from Alberta
Politicians from Calgary
Progressive Conservative Association of Alberta MLAs
University of Calgary alumni
Electricians
21st-century Canadian politicians